Los Parias was a Peruvian anarchist newspaper. Published from 1904 to 1910, it was the first anarchist newspaper to appear in Peru.

One this publications' most famous authors was Manuel González Prada, who wrote for it many of the essays that would compose his important posthumous book, Anarquía, one of the first anarchist tracts to be published in Peru.

See also
 List of newspapers in Peru
 Media of Peru

References

Defunct newspapers published in Peru
Newspapers published in Peru
Publications established in 1904
Publications disestablished in 1910
Spanish-language newspapers
1904 establishments in Peru
1910 disestablishments in Peru
Anarchist newspapers